Yvonnick Prené is a French harmonica player and a recording artist.

Life and career
Born in Paris, he began as a guitarist, later switching to the diatonic harmonica, and eventually settling on the chromatic harmonica as his primary instrument. He first began playing the harmonica professionally in Parisian clubs at 17, then started his studies at Sorbonne University, from which he received a master's degree in music (2011). While still enrolled at the Sorbonne, Prené relocated to New York City and was awarded multiple full-tuition scholarships at The City College of New York, (MICEFA, 2007), Columbia University (Alliance Program, 2008) and at the New School for Jazz and Contemporary Music (Merit-Based Scholarship, 2009) where he had the opportunity to study with Lee Konitz and Reggie Workman among others. In 2011-2012 he earned a BA from The New School for Jazz & Contemporary Music and Master's degree from Sorbonne University.

He has performed and recorded with a wide range of artists, including Donald Brown, Klingande, Romeo Santos, Peter Bernstein, Scott Tixier, Gene Bertoncini, Rich Perry, Steve Cardenas, Jon Cowherd, Vic Juris, Nate Smith, Ira Coleman, Thomas Enhco, Mino Cinelu Luques Curtis, Eric Lewis, ELEW, Justin Brown, Jerome Barde, Lorin Cohen, Mike Moreno, Avi Rothebard, Jared Gold, Anthony Wonsey, Clovis Nicholas, Laurent Cugny, Alexandre Tassel, Dana Hall, Gilad Hekselman, Jon Davis, Krystle Warren, Yaron Herman, Laurent de Wilde, Ryan Cohan, Victor Provost among many others.
Yvonnick has played at Blue Note Jazz Club, Smalls Jazz Club at the Iridium Jazz Club, The Jazz Gallery at Birdland (New York jazz club) at Bern Jazz Festival, Festival Emoi du Jazz (Côte d'Ivoire), Lamentin Jazz Festival, Green Mill Cocktail Lounge, at Jazz in Marciac, Hyde Park Jazz Festival (Chicago), Sidedoor Jazz Club, Jazz Gallery, Jazz on Ubaye, Jazz Sur Seine Festival, at Le Duc des Lombards.

Yvonnick is the founder of New York Harmonica School, Harmonica Studio  author of several books and bandleader of Yvonnick Prené quartet. Yvonnick is a Hohner Ambassador.

Discography
As leader
LISTEN!, Sunnyside Records, (2023)
New York Moments, SteepleChase Records, (2019)
Breathe, featuring Peter Bernstein, CdBaby, (2016)
Merci Toots, featuring Pasquale Grasso, CdBaby, (2015)
Wonderful World, Padam Swing Band, CdBaby, (2014)
Jour de Fête, Steeplechase Records, (2013) 
As sideman
Lady in Waiting, Brian Penry,(2023)
New York Quintet, Pierre Alexandre Petiot,(2023)
Real Slim Shady But Faster,Anthony Vincent,(2022)
Wings of a Dove, Mi Yiten Li, Cedars of Lebanonn/ BMAD Music, (2021)
Pause, Taj Weeks, Jatta Records(2021)
Since You've Been Around, Alia Sheffield + Sold'D' Out, Fairground Records, (2020)
Death Rides a Horse, Arthur Vint, Ropeadope, (2017)
Date Night, Karickter (2016)
Aquarius Woman, Marcello Pellitteri (2016)
Cosmic Adventure, Scott Tixier, Sunnyside Records, (2016)
A Door, Joonsam, Origin Records, (2016) 
Through the Badlands, Arthur Vint and Associates, Ropeadope, (2016) 
Home, Lorin Cohen, Origin Records, (2015)
Movements, Alexandre Tassel, Naive, (2008)
Euro Latin Jazz, Rebecca Vallejo, Cuca Jazz Production, (2007)

Bibliography
100 Jazz Patterns for Chromatic Harmonica Vol 1, (2015)
Jazz Etudes for Chromatic Harmonica Vol1, (2015)
100 Jazz Patterns for Chromatic Harmonica Vol 2, (2016)
100 Easy Blues Harmonica Licks, (2016)]
Easy Harmonica Songbook for Chromatic Harmonica (2016)
Easy Harmonica Songbook for Diatonic Harmonica (2016)

References

External links
 Official biography	
 JazzTimes	
 Jazz Magazine, France	
 French Morning		
 France Amerique		
 Yvonnick Prene and Lorin Cohen, Chicago Tribune
 Yvonnick Prené's site
 Facebook page
 YouTube Channel

Chamber jazz musicians
1984 births
Living people
French jazz musicians
French harmonica players
Musicians from Paris
French expatriates in the United States